Cho Min-ho (4 January 1987 – 15 June 2022) was a South Korean professional ice hockey center.

He played for Anyang Halla. Cho won the 2009–2010 Young Guy of the Year award.

Cho died from lung cancer in Seoul, on 15 June 2022, at the age of 35.

References

External links

1987 births
2022 deaths
HL Anyang players
Asian Games bronze medalists for South Korea
Asian Games medalists in ice hockey
Asian Games silver medalists for South Korea
Ice hockey players at the 2011 Asian Winter Games
Ice hockey players at the 2017 Asian Winter Games
Ice hockey players at the 2018 Winter Olympics
Ice hockey people from Seoul
Olympic ice hockey players of South Korea
Medalists at the 2011 Asian Winter Games
Medalists at the 2017 Asian Winter Games
South Korean ice hockey centres
Deaths from lung cancer in South Korea